This is a list of administrators and governors of Kaduna State. Kaduna State was created on 27 May 1967 as North Central State and on 17 Mar 1976 was renamed Kaduna State.

See also
States of Nigeria
List of state governors of Nigeria

References

Kaduna State
Kaduna